The Steel Bridge is a through truss, double-deck vertical-lift bridge across the Willamette River in Portland, Oregon, United States, opened in 1912. Its lower deck carries railroad and bicycle/pedestrian traffic, while the upper deck carries road traffic (on the Pacific Highway West No. 1W, former Oregon Route 99W), and light rail (MAX), making the bridge one of the most multimodal in the world.  It is the only double-deck bridge with independent lifts in the world and the second oldest vertical-lift bridge in North America, after the nearby Hawthorne Bridge. The bridge links the Rose Quarter and Lloyd District in the east to Old Town Chinatown neighborhood in the west.

History
The bridge was completed in 1912 and replaced the Steel Bridge that was built in 1888 as a double-deck swing-span bridge. The 1888 structure was the first railroad bridge across the Willamette River in Portland.  Its name originated because steel, instead of wrought iron, was used in its construction, which was very unusual for the time. When the current Steel Bridge opened, it was simply given its predecessor's name.

The bridge was designed by the engineering firm of Waddell & Harrington,  which was based in Kansas City, Missouri, but also had an office in Portland. The structure was built by Union Pacific Railroad and the Oregon-Washington Railroad and Navigation Company (OWR&N) at a cost of $1.7 million (equivalent to $ million in ). It opened in July 1912 to rail traffic and on August 9, 1912, to automobiles.

The 1888 Steel Bridge (upper deck) had been crossed by horse-drawn streetcars from the time of its opening and then by the city's first electric streetcar line starting in November 1889; when the present Steel Bridge opened in 1912, the streetcar lines (all electric by then) moved to it, starting on September 8, 1912.  Streetcar service across the Steel continued until August 1, 1948, when the last car lines using it, the Alberta and Broadway Lines, were abandoned.  A single line of Portland's once-extensive trolley bus system also used the bridge; the Williams Avenue line crossed the Steel Bridge from February 1937 until October 9, 1949.  Many years later, in 1986, electric transit vehicles returned to the bridge in the form of MAX Light Rail and later the Portland Vintage Trolley.

In 1950, the Steel Bridge became an important part of a new U.S. 99W highway between Harbor Drive and Interstate Avenue. It was also sought for use by Interstate 5, which was later moved to the Marquam Bridge. Harbor Drive was removed in 1974 and replaced with Tom McCall Waterfront Park.

In the mid-1980s, the bridge underwent a $10 million rehabilitation, including construction of the MAX light rail line of TriMet.  The span was closed to all traffic for two years, starting in June 1984. It reopened on May 31, 1986. Completion and testing of the light-rail tracks and overhead wires across the bridge took place during the months that followed, and the light rail line opened for service on September 5, 1986.

A single-lane viaduct that connected the bridge's east approach to another viaduct (still in existence) that takes traffic from southbound Interstate 5 to Interstate 84 was closed in 1988 and removed in 1989, as part of roadway changes intended to improve traffic flow around the Oregon Convention Center. The center was under construction at that time and opened in 1990.

The lower deck of the bridge was threatened by major floods in 1948, 1964, and 1996.

The bridge is owned by Union Pacific with the upper deck leased to Oregon Department of Transportation, and subleased to TriMet, while the City of Portland is responsible for the approaches.

The average daily traffic in 2000 was 23,100 vehicles (including many TriMet buses), 200 MAX trains, 40 freight and Amtrak trains, and 500 bicycles. The construction of the lower-deck walkway connected to the Eastbank Esplanade resulted in a sharp increase in bicycle traffic, with over 2,100 daily bicycle crossings in 2005. MAX traffic has tripled since 2000, when only the Gresham–Hillsboro line (now the Blue Line) was using the bridge,  to 605 daily crossings (weekdays) as of 2012. This resulted from the addition of three more MAX lines during that period:  the Red, Yellow, Green Lines.

In summer 2008, the upper deck was closed for three weeks to allow a junction to be built at the west end connecting the existing MAX tracks with a new MAX line on the Portland Transit Mall.  A change made at that time was that the two inner lanes became restricted to MAX trains only, with cars, buses and other motorized traffic permitted only in the two outer lanes.

In 2012, the Steel Bridge celebrated its 100th birthday. The Oregonian called it the "hardest-working" bridge on the Willamette River: "Cars, trucks, freight trains, buses, Amtrak, MAX, pedestrians, bicycles — you carry it all."

Structure and lift operation

Each deck has its own counterweights, two for the upper and eight for the lower, totaling 9 million lbs. (4,100 metric tons).

The machinery house sits atop the upper-deck lift truss. The operator's room is suspended from the top of the lift-span truss, directly below the machinery house, so that the operator can view river traffic as well as the upper deck.  After the 2001 addition of a pedestrian walkway on the lower deck, cameras and closed-circuit television monitors were added to allow the operator to view the lower-deck walkway.

Until the bridge's mid-1980s renovation, the crossing gates blocking the roadway and sidewalks during raising of the upper-deck lift span were manually operated, rotated horizontally across the roadway by two "gate tenders", one on each side of the lift span. Small shacks for the gatekeepers were positioned on the roadway deck, between the inner and outer traffic lanes, but they were removed during the 1980s rebuilding and replaced by a new gate tender house positioned above the roadway, in the west lift tower.  Powered crossing gates replaced the manual ones, and operation of the gates is now automated, controlled by the bridge operator.

See also

List of bridges documented by the Historic American Engineering Record in Oregon
List of crossings of the Willamette River

References
 General

 Specific

External links

ODOT Steel Bridge page

1912 establishments in Oregon
Bridges completed in 1888
Bridges completed in 1912
Bridges in Portland, Oregon
Bridges over the Willamette River
Historic American Engineering Record in Oregon
Kerns, Portland, Oregon
Light rail bridges
Lloyd District, Portland, Oregon
MAX Light Rail
North Portland, Oregon
Northeast Portland, Oregon
Northwest Portland, Oregon
Old Town Chinatown
Railroad bridges in Oregon
Road-rail bridges in the United States
Road bridges in Oregon
Southern Pacific Railroad
Steel bridges in the United States
Swing bridges in Oregon
Truss bridges in the United States
Union Pacific Railroad bridges
U.S. Route 99
Vertical lift bridges in Oregon